Carpe Diem — Live in USA 2006 is an official bootleg by the Swedish progressive rock band The Flower Kings. It is The Flower Kings' performance at Whittier in California on October 16, 2006, plus a bonus track from their show at Quebec City.

It was released through Roine Stolt's own label, Foxtrot Records.

Track listing
All songs by Roine Stolt except where noted.
 "Paradox Hotel" (Tomas Bodin, Stolt) – 7:40
 "Psychedelic Postcard" – 10:45
 "Hudson River Sirens Call 1998" – 5:55
 "Fish Soup" (drum and bass solo) (Marcus Liliequist, Jonas Reingold) – 7:12
 "Pioneers of Aviation" – 4:01
 "Just This Once" – 13:40
 "World of Adventures" – 8:50
 "A Vampire's View" (Quebec City bonus track) – 9:53

Personnel
Roine Stolt - vocals, guitars
Tomas Bodin - keyboards
Hasse Fröberg - vocals, guitars
Jonas Reingold - bass guitar, vocals
Marcus Liliequist - drums

References

2006 live albums
The Flower Kings albums